Herscha Hill is an elevated landform in Aberdeenshire, Scotland. Neolithic archaeological finds have been made at this location.

References
 Aberdeenshire Council archeological sites: Herscha Hill, retrieved Aug. 2008

Line notes

Archaeological sites in Aberdeenshire
Stone Age sites in Scotland
Neolithic Scotland